Brendan O'Connor (born 23 January 1970) is an Irish media personality and comedian. He presents the Current Affairs panel show Cutting Edge on RTÉ. He presented The Saturday Night Show on RTE from 2010 to 2015, he is also known for his appearances on page 3 newspaper. He is also editor of the newspaper's Life Magazine.

O'Connor's pop career included a one-hit wonder as Fr Brian & The Fun Loving Cardinals, the comedy song "Who's in the House?", reaching number 3 in the Irish charts.

O'Connor has pursued varied media career over several decades in Ireland. During the 1990s he appeared on Don't Feed the Gondolas, as well as on a number of other TV programmes. During the 2000s he served a member of the judging panel on Raidió Teilifís Éireann's (RTÉ) You're a Star TV talent contest before presenting The Apprentice: You're Fired! and The Saturday Night Show. With a salary of €228,500 in 2011, he is one of RTÉ's highest paid stars.

Early life
O'Connor grew up in the Bishopstown area of Cork in County Cork. He is a past pupil of Coláiste an Spioraid Naoimh, Bishopstown, Cork. During his time there as a student, he was runner-up in the All-Ireland Schools' Debating Competition. He is also a graduate of University College Cork (UCC) — where he was Recording Secretary of the UCC Philosophical Society. He famously lost the Minutes Book of the "Golden Age" at a party.

"Who's in the House" and Don't Feed the Gondolas
Initially, O'Connor attempted to become a comedian and was also a singer in a number of bands while still a student at UCC, but with limited success, including the band that eventually became The Frank and Walters. He moved to Dublin in the mid-1990s. Soon after this, he started freelance work with the Sunday Independent, one of Ireland's best-selling newspapers. At the same time he also performed a comedy routine at a well-known Dublin venue. He was noticed by TV producers from RTÉ and joined Don't Feed the Gondolas, a comedy television programme broadcast by RTÉ that ran for four seasons. O'Connor was one of the team captains on the panel, and after 2 seasons took over as host.

O'Connor, as a member of the band Fr Brian & The Fun Loving Cardinals, produced a single, "Who's in the House?", which spent 12 weeks in the Irish Singles Chart, peaking at number 3. The song was a novelty number that played on the popularity of the TV series Father Ted. O'Connor sang it while dressed as a trendy Roman Catholic priest (Fr Brian) and it featured such lines as:
 "The parish disco is strictly drug-free",
 "Saved their souls when he was nailed to a cross - some call him Jesus, I call him boss",
 "Who’s in the house? Jesus in the house", and
 "Putting the diction back in Benediction."
The name "Fun Lovin' Cardinals" is itself a pun on the band Fun Lovin' Criminals. The character Fr Brian had appeared on Don't Feed the Gondolas, and the popularity of the song led to its release, and subsequent chart position.

You're a Star TV talent contest
In 2005, O'Connor made his debut as a judge on Charity You're a Star, a charitable version of the You're a Star TV talent contest. Subsequently, he appeared as a judge on the main series of You're a Star. This was a televised talent show which selected what is deemed to be the best Irish act from among many. The winner was awarded a cash prize and groomed for a career in the entertainment industry. It had a niche following - primarily teenagers. Much of the show's popularity was attributed to the robust manner with which O'Connor treated many of the contestants - many of whom were gullible young hopefuls. He frequently evoked controversy with his comments on the show. However, on You're a Star, O'Connor claimed that he was "only saying what the people at home are thinking". The show was cancelled after the 2008 season.

Sunday Independent column

In many of his newspaper articles on Irish politics, O'Connor strongly supports Fianna Fáil. He was also a supporter of Bertie Ahern and has described Ahern as "a great Taoiseach".

O'Connor frequently writes an article that appears on the bottom corner of the front page of the Sunday Independent. He also edits the paper's Life magazine, a glossy supplement to the paper. Articles by O'Connor also appear throughout many other sections of the paper. He writes on an extremely broad range of topics—which can include any subject. He regularly writes on subjects such as politics, travel, entertainment and gossip (primarily relating to well-known figures in Irish life).

His writing has been described as shallow, bipolar and at times racist. Irish political magazine The Phoenix, has criticised his journalism, saying:

Support for Bertie Ahern and Fianna Fáil
O'Connor frequently refers to Bertie Ahern in his articles simply and affectionately as "Bertie". His "relationship" with Ahern has been tense. In August 2003 he had a row with Ahern on a flight returning from Ahern's daughter's wedding in France, when Ahern refused to grant him an interview. O'Connor has also criticised Ahern at times, like in his article in the Sunday Independent, 9 May 2004, where he wrote:

In this same article O'Connor lamented the expulsion of Beverley Flynn, a TD, from the Fianna Fáil Party for the second time arising out of corruption charges, stating that she was "indeed a class act and is someone we need more of in Irish politics." He also referred to her as a "principled woman".

Criticism of Ahern by O'Connor has been minimal, overall O'Connor has backed Ahern, especially when such support was most needed. O'Connor, along with Eoghan Harris, strongly supported Bertie Ahern during the 2007 general election and during his appearances before the Mahon Tribunal. Ahern subsequently appointed Harris as a Senator.

As pressure grew on Bertie Ahern due to revelations from the Mahon Tribunal (regarding unexplained payments Ahern had received in the 1990s), O'Connor called for the Tribunal to be shut down:

On Wednesday, 2 April 2008, Bertie Ahern announced he would be resigning as Taoiseach and did so on 6 May 2008. Investigations into payments Ahern received are ongoing.

On Friday, 19 February 2010, Fianna Fáil TD Willie O'Dea resigned as Minister for Defence for committing perjury in front of the High Court. Two days later in his weekly column in the Sunday Independent, O'Connor entered into a vitriolic attack on the politicians who called for his resignation, especially Green Party Senator Dan Boyle:

Role in the Bertie-era Irish property bubble
O'Connor was a leading voice in the Irish media endorsing the high valuation of Irish property during the peak of the Irish property bubble.

On 12 November 2006 he wrote an article in the Sunday Tribune, "So who's the real daddy of the Pope's Children" that ridiculed David McWilliams – who was one of the principal voices during the property bubble who warned about the potential effect on the Irish property market of interest rate increases, over-supply, the fact that average wages had fallen way behind the average price of a house, and existing high levels of personal indebtedness.

On 21 Jan 2007 O’Connor penned an article "Jade Cowen and the Big Housing Bother that needs to be voted off". Here he urged his readers, "... There is only one answer to all this. We must stand firm. Don't sell right now. This is as bad as it gets, and while it's scary, important decisions shouldn't be made in a time of panic. Hang on a year. Don't be pushed around by Cowen and smug buyers who think they're in the driving seat..."

Soon after that on 11 Feb 2007 O’Connor advocated in another piece, "Shout from the rooftops: house prices are rising", his opinion that "... Furthermore the economy looks healthy, demand for houses will increase as we continue to add about 100,000 people a year to our population, and as there are fewer people per household, more households are needed for the same number of people. And job creation continues apace too. All of these actual factors point to a healthy property market. And by healthy we mean house prices going up...".

In July 2007, O'Connor penned what became his most notorious article, "The smart, ballsy guys are buying up property right now", advising his readers to invest in property, saying that "... the really smart and ballsy guys are the guys who are buying when no one else is... " and, ".... if I wasn't already massively over-exposed to the property market by virtue of owning a reasonable home, I'd be buying property...".

Later on, post-collapse of the Irish property market, O’Connor wrote on 14 June 2009, "... As a homeowner, in massive negative equity, who knows a lot of other homeowners who are in massive negative equity, I want to know why John Hurley, Governor of the Central Bank of Ireland, has a job. I want to know who the f--ck John Hurley thinks he is. He and his Central Bank cronies have made a complete balls of this country. I want John Hurley fired...".

And on 10 January 2010 he wrote an article, "No use cursing day we mounted property ladder" where he lamented the media's role in the bubble - "... All those paper millions that made us all feel so rich are gone, and now we curse the day we ever got on the ladder, we curse the ancestry that gave us this obsession with the land, and we curse the politicians, the banks and the media that encouraged the madness...”.

Also in January 2010, O'Connor castigated a journalist who brought up the subject of his July 2007 "ballsy" article during an interview. O'Connor claimed that the article contained valid opinions originating from original thinking. The journalist related in his article how O’Connor became angry, and didn't let him speak, with O'Connor claiming, “… I came here and opened up out of respect. And you know why? Because I believe in freedom of speech. Anyone else would have said 'I'm not sitting down with that c**t'. Seriously they would. You went away and found a piece in Google and harangued me on this one piece I wrote in 15 years of writing... Look, I've no wish to airbrush over anything I've written in the past," he says. "But do I regret it? No, because it was valid position at the time. So yes I got it wrong in one article..."

In April 2010 he again returned to the topic with an article entitled, "Let someone walk all over you...". This article made analogy of abusive domestic personal relationships with the central banks' position that caution must be exercised with respect to bailing out those with mortgage difficulties. O' Connor used this device to make emotional appeal writing such as, "... naturally, like everyone in an abusive relationship, we are tending to blame ourselves in some way..." and, "... Clearly the Central Bank thinks that we are so battered and bruised at this stage, and that we have taken so much crap from them, that we will put up with anything..."Other
O'Connor supported the 2003 invasion of Iraq by the United States government.

In early 2004, O'Connor enraged some of his colleagues by strongly supporting management during an industrial relations crisis over forced redundancy.

The Saturday Night Show
In 2010, O'Connor began hosting TV chat programme The Saturday Night Show on RTÉ One. His controversial interview with Michael Barrymore brought him to the attention of the British press. His interview with Oliver Callan, during which the impressionist announced he was gay, brought him to the attention of the international press.

On 14 March 2015, O'Connor announced without warning live on air his resignation as host of The Saturday Night Show and that the show would finish for good at the end of that series on 30 May 2015.

Personal life
O'Connor married Sarah Caden in 1999. She is also a journalist with the Sunday Independent and she is the daughter of John Caden, an independent television producer. The couple have two children, a daughter, born in early 2008, Anna and a daughter born in August 2010, Mary. O'Connor wrote about her diagnosis with Down syndrome in his Sunday Independent'' column in September 2010, drawing a warm response from readers.

O'Connor tested positive for COVID-19 in March 2022.

See also
 List of one-hit wonders in Ireland

References

External links
 Profile on UCC Philosoph's wiki project
 Profile: Brendan O'Connor From The Sunday Times
 O'Connor's Sunday Independent article about "Who's In The House?"
 O'Connor's Sunday Independent article about "The smart, ballsy guys are buying up property right now"

1970 births
Living people
Alumni of University College Cork
Irish columnists
Irish television talk show hosts
Irish television personalities
People from County Cork
RTÉ television presenters
Sunday Independent (Ireland) people
Virgin Media Television (Ireland) presenters